Forbidden City is a novel based on the events of the Tiananmen Square massacre in 1989. It is a story of maturation/coming of age.

Awards
The book is the winner of the Ruth Schwartz Award for Excellence, the Belgium Prize for Excellence and several other awards.

Curriculum
The book is often included in reading material for North American schools.

Censorship 
The book is currently banned in China.

References

1990 novels
Novels set in China
Fiction set in 1989